Pennsylvania State Senate District 8 includes parts of Delaware County and Philadelphia County. It is currently represented by Democrat Anthony Hardy Williams.

District profile
The district includes the following areas:

Delaware County
 Collingdale
 Colwyn
 Darby
 Darby Township 
 Folcroft
 Norwood
 Sharon Hill
 Tinicum Township
 Yeadon

Philadelphia County
Ward 03
Ward 26 [PART, Divisions 04, 05, 06, 07, 08, 09, 10, 11, 12, 13, 14, 15, 16, 17, 18, 19, 21 and 22]
Ward 27 [PART, Divisions 01, 02, 04, 05, 07, 08, 09, 10, 12, 14, 15, 16, 17, 19, 20, 21, 22 and 23]
Ward 36
Ward 40 [PART, Divisions 01, 02, 03, 04, 05, 06, 07, 08, 09, 10, 11, 12, 13, 14, 15, 16, 17, 18, 19, 20, 21, 22, 23, 24, 25, 26, 27, 28, 29, 31, 32, 33, 34, 35, 36, 37, 39, 41, 42, 43, 44, 45, 46, 47, 48, 49, 50 and 51]
Ward 46 [PART, Divisions 01, 02, 03, 04, 05, 06, 08, 09, 10, 11, 12, 13, 14, 15, 16, 17, 18, 20 and 21]
Ward 48
Ward 51
Ward 60 [PART, Divisions 06, 07, 10, 11, 17, 18, 19, 20, 21 and 22]

Senators

References

Pennsylvania Senate districts
Government of Philadelphia
Government of Delaware County, Pennsylvania